Hamilton Creek is a stream in St. Louis County in the U.S. state of Missouri. It is a tributary of the Meramec River.

Hamilton Creek has the name of Ninan Hamilton, a cattleman.

See also
List of rivers of Missouri

References

Rivers of St. Louis County, Missouri
Rivers of Missouri